Roy Chanslor (August 25, 1899 - April 16, 1964) was a novelist and screenwriter. Several of his works were filmed. Chanslor was born in Liberty, Missouri. He and his wife lived in Carmel, California. He died  in Encino, California.

Written works
Johnny Guitar (1953)
Trouble With Paradise (1954)The Naked I (1953)The Ballad of Cat Ballou (1956)

FilmographyFront Page Woman (1935), co-writerThe Vigilantes Return (1947), scriptHazard (1948), novel and screenplayThe Steel Key (1953), storyJohnny Guitar (1954)Cat Ballou'' (1965)

References

1899 births
1964 deaths
20th-century American screenwriters
American screenwriters